Tokyo 2nd district (東京都第2区 Tōkyō-to dai-ni-ku or simply 東京2区 Tōkyō ni-ku) is a constituency of the House of Representatives in the Diet of Japan (national legislature). It is located in eastern mainland Tokyo and covers central parts of the former Tokyo City. The district consists of the wards of Chūō, Bunkyō and Taitō. As of 2012, 424,273 eligible voters were registered in the district.

Before the electoral reform of 1994, the area formed Tokyo 8th district where two Representatives had been elected by single non-transferable vote. The current Representative for the 2nd district is Liberal Democrat Kiyoto Tsuji who won in the 2012 Representatives election with less than a third of the vote.

List of representatives

Election results

References 

Districts of the House of Representatives (Japan)
Politics of Tokyo